Rodney Dale Clawson (born in Gruver, Texas, United States) is an American country music songwriter. Clawson has written singles recorded by Kenny Chesney, Jason Aldean, Faith Hill, George Strait and Luke Bryan, among others.

Biography
Clawson was raised in Gruver, Texas. Through the encouragement of his friend and former student John Rich, Clawson signed to his publishing contract in 2000. His first hit as a songwriter was "I Can't Be Your Friend" by Rushlow.

Clawson co-wrote the songs "Why", "Amarillo Sky" and "Johnny Cash" for Jason Aldean. In 2008, he received a Song of the Year nomination from the Country Music Association for George Strait's number 1 single "I Saw God Today". That same year, Clawson moved to a publishing contract with Big Loud Shirt, owned by songwriter Craig Wiseman.

Other artists who have recorded his songs include Faith Hill, Big & Rich and Buddy Jewell. He has also produced singles by Jake Owen and James Wesley.

He is married to singer-songwriter Nicolle Galyon, who was also a contestant on the second season of The Voice. They have two children- a daughter, Charlie Jo Clawson (born May 29, 2013) and a son, Ford Sterling Clawson (born April 14, 2015). He also has three children from a previous marriage, including Brad Clawson, who is also a Nashville songwriter.

List of singles written by Rodney Clawson

References

American country songwriters
American male songwriters
Living people
Songwriters from Texas
People from Hansford County, Texas
Year of birth missing (living people)